The 1797 New Hampshire gubernatorial election took place on March 14, 1797. Incumbent Federalist Governor John Taylor Gilman won re-election to a fourth term.

Results

References 

Gubernatorial
New Hampshire
1797